Almenara is a municipality located in the province of Castellón, Valencian Community, Spain.

Notable people
 Jaume Doménech, footballer

Municipalities in the Province of Castellón
Plana Baixa